The Dragon Book may refer to:
 Principles of Compiler Design, a book by Alfred V. Aho, and Jeffrey D. Ullman
 Compilers: Principles, Techniques, and Tools, a book by Alfred V. Aho, Monica S. Lam, Ravi Sethi, and Jeffrey D. Ullman